The Hohe Tauern window is a geological structure in the Austrian Central Eastern Alps. It is a window (in German fenster) in the Austroalpine nappes where high-grade metamorphic rocks of the underlying Penninic nappes crop out. The structure is caused by a large dome-like antiform in the nappe stacks of the Alps.

The relatively hard rocks of the Hohe Tauern window are more resistant to erosion, so the window has a high relief. The mountain chains thus formed are called the Hohe Tauern. Most of Austria's highest mountains are in the Hohe Tauern, among them the Großglockner (3798 m) and Großvenediger (3674 m).

See also

References

External links

Geology of the Alps
Structural geology
Geology of Austria
Geology of Italy
Window